Christine Gabillard (born 2 January 1970) is a French archer. She competed in the women's individual and team events at the 1992 Summer Olympics.

References

External links
 

1970 births
Living people
French female archers
Olympic archers of France
Archers at the 1992 Summer Olympics
Sportspeople from Paris